Miss Europe 2003, was the 56th edition and the first edition under Endemol France; who bought the pageant from Mr. Roger Zeigler and the Mondial Events Organization in between this edition and the previous edition. This years pageant was held at Eurodisney in Nogent-sur-Marne, France on September 12, 2003. Zsuzsanna Laky of Hungary, was crowned Miss Europe 2003 by outgoing titleholder Svetlana Koroleva of Russia.

Results

Placements

Special awards

Judges 
Hélène Ségara
Jean Alesi
Corinne Touzet
Eros Ramazzotti
Ricky Martin
Inna Zobova
Cédric Pioline

Contestants 

 - Edona Sllanmiku
 - Anush Grigoryan
 - Bianca Zudrell 
 - Olga Serezhnikova 
 - Julie Taton
 - Dragana Sojic
 - Iva Titova
 - Nina Slamic
 - Elena Andreou
 - Markéta Divišová
 - Stine Mose
 - Maili Nomm
 - Piritta Hannula
 - Corinne Coman
 - Alexandra Vodjanikova
 - Natalie Monteverde
 - Marietta Chrousala
 - Elise Boulogne
 - Zsuzsanna Laky
 - Ragnhildur Steinunn Jonsdottir
 - Catrina Supple
 - Shahar Nehorai
 - Jelena Keirane
 - Oksana Semenishina
 -  Odette Cauchi
 - Marna Haugen
 - Marta Matyjasik
 - Iva Catarina da Silva Lamarao
 - Yuliya Akhonkova
 Serbia and Montenegro - Sanja Papić
 - Miroslava Luberdova
 - Patricia Ledesma Nieto 
 - Caroline Österberg
 - Claudia Oehler
 - Yelda Kaya
 - Nataliya Chernyak
 - Samantha Vaughan

References

External links 
 

Miss Europe
2003 in Europe
2003 beauty pageants